Manju is a 1983 Malayalam film based on the novel of the same name by M. T. Vasudevan Nair. The film was scripted and directed by M. T. Vasudevan Nair himself and stars Sangeeta Naik, Nanditha Bose, Indira, Sankar Mohan and Desh Maheshwari.

Plot
Set in Nainital, Manju is about Vimala Devi, a teacher in a boarding school, who waits in hope for the winter of her discontent to vanish. Another important character is Buddhu, who waits for his Englishman father to return to Nainital. Loneliness and endless waiting are recurring motifs in the film.

Cast
 Sangeeta Naik as Vimala
Nanditha Bose as Mother
 Indira as Younger Sister
 Kalpana as Rashmi
 Shankar Mohan as Sudheer
 C. S. Dubey as Amar Singh
 Desh Maheshwari as Budhu
 Dinesh Thakur as Sardarji

Soundtrack
The music was composed by M. B. Sreenivasan and the lyrics were written by Gulzar. All the songs are in Hindi as the film is completely set in Nainital.

Hindi version
The novel also had a Hindi-language film adaptation titled Sarath Sandhya.

References

External links
 
 Manju at the Malayalam Movie Database

1983 films
1980s Malayalam-language films
Films with screenplays by M. T. Vasudevan Nair
Films based on Indian novels
Films set in Uttarakhand
Films directed by M. T. Vasudevan Nair